Domingo Antonio Acevedo (born March 6, 1994) is a Dominican professional baseball pitcher for the Oakland Athletics of Major League Baseball (MLB). For a few hours on July 21, 2018, Acevedo was on the Yankees’ active roster, but did not appear in a game, earning him the distinction of being a “phantom ballplayer”, a distinction which he held until his MLB debut in 2021.

Career

New York Yankees
Acevedo signed with the New York Yankees as an international free agent in 2012 for a $7,500 signing bonus. He made his professional debut in 2013 with the Dominican Summer League Yankees where he had a 1–2 win–loss record and a 2.63 earned run average (ERA) in 11 games (ten starts) and spent 2014 with the Gulf Coast Yankees where he pitched to a 0–1 record and 4.11 ERA in only five starts. Acevedo started 2015 with the Charleston RiverDogs, making one start before going on the disabled list. When he returned from injury he was sent to the Staten Island Yankees. In 12 starts between the two teams he compiled a 3–0 record, 1.81 ERA, and 1.11 WHIP. He started 2016 with Charleston, and later joined the Tampa Yankees. He finished 2016 with a 5–4 record and a 2.61 ERA in 18 combined starts between the two teams.

Acevedo began the 2017 season with Tampa and was promoted to the Trenton Thunder and Scranton/Wilkes-Barre RailRiders throughout the season. He appeared in the 2017 All-Star Futures Game. In 23 combined starts between Tampa, Trenton and Scranton/Wilkes-Barre Acevedo was 6–6 with a 3.25 ERA. The Yankees added him to their 40-man roster after the season.

In 2018, Acevedo began the season with Trenton. He spent six weeks on the disabled list due to a blister. The Yankees promoted him to the major leagues on July 21, but in only a few hours, he was optioned back to Double-A. He finished the year with a 3–3 record and 2.99 ERA between Staten Island and Scranton.

Acevedo was released by the Yankees organization on August 23, 2019. He re-signed on a minor league deal on August 26. He finished the year with an 8–1 record and 4.35 ERA in  innings between Scranton and Trenton. Acevedo did not play in a game in 2020 due to the cancellation of the minor league season because of the COVID-19 pandemic. On November 2, 2020, he elected free agency.

Oakland Athletics
On November 16, 2020, Acevedo signed a minor league contract with the Oakland Athletics organization. He was assigned to the Triple-A Las Vegas Aviators to begin the year, and recorded a 2.76 ERA with 27 strikeouts in  innings pitched. On June 21, 2021, Acevedo was selected to the 40-man roster and promoted to the major leagues. He made his MLB debut that day, pitching a scoreless inning of relief against the Texas Rangers. In the game, he also notched his first career strikeout, punching out Rangers infielder Isiah Kiner-Falefa.
In 3 innings for Oakland, Acevedo posted an ERA of 9.00 with 3 strikeouts. On July 30, he was designated for assignment by the A's.
He was released the following day.

On August 2, Acevedo resigned with Oakland on a minor league deal. On September 14, Acevedo was re-selected to the active roster.

Acevedo began the 2022 season with the Athletics.

References

External links

1994 births
Living people
People from Santiago Rodríguez Province
Dominican Republic expatriate baseball players in the United States
Major League Baseball players from the Dominican Republic
Major League Baseball pitchers
Oakland Athletics players
Dominican Summer League Yankees players
Gulf Coast Yankees players
Staten Island Yankees players
Charleston RiverDogs players
Surprise Saguaros players
Tampa Yankees players
Trenton Thunder players
Scranton/Wilkes-Barre RailRiders players
Estrellas Orientales players
Las Vegas Aviators players